Sage Walker is an American science-fiction writer based in New Mexico. She contributed to the Wild Cards series and won the Locus Award in 1997 for her debut novel, Whiteout. She was one of several science fiction authors who attended a 2009 United States Department of Homeland Security conference on science and technology aimed at preventing future terrorist attacks.

References

External links

Year of birth missing (living people)
Living people
20th-century American novelists
20th-century American women writers
21st-century American novelists
21st-century American women writers
American women novelists
Writers from New Mexico